Chalkomata (Greek: Χαλκωματά) is a neighbourhood in the central part of the city of Patras.  It is named after the Chalkomatas family in which they arrived in the area in 1688 from Athens. In 1923, it united with the neighbourhood of Gyri or Giri and became a new subdivision under the name Skagiopouleio.

It is called also and Nea Kypros.

People
Antonios Kalamogdartis, politician

References
 Δ. Καρατζά, Χ. Χαραλάμπους, Δ. Γκότση, Γ. Λύρα, Πάτρα, ονομάτων επίσκεψις, Έκδοση των εφημερίδων Εθνικός Κήρυξ των Πατρών και Ημερήσιος Κήρυξ των Πατρών, Πάτρα 1995 (in Greek)
 Ν.Ι. Λυμπέρη, Οδηγός Πατρών, 4η έκδοση, Πάτρα 2005, σελ. 48 (in Greek)

References
The first version of the article is translated and is based from the article at the Greek Wikipedia (el:Main Page)

Neighborhoods in Patras